Lobendava is a municipality and village in Děčín District in the Ústí nad Labem Region of the Czech Republic. It has about 300 inhabitants. It is the northernmost municipality of the country.

Administrative parts
The village of Severní is an administrative part of Lobendava.

Geography

It is located in the Šluknov Hook area close to the border with Germany, and is adjacent to Neustadt in Sachsen.

Lobendava is the northernmost municipality in the Czech Republic.

History
The first written mention of Lobendava is from 1449. According to the municipal chronicle, it was founded at the turn of the 12th and 13th centuries, according to regional historians it could be founded already around 1084. The village was located on the historic Imperial route from Prague to Dresden.

Sights
The main historic landmark is the Baroque complex of the Church of the Visitation of the Virgin Mary with the rectory.

Notable people
Anton Drasche (1826–1904), Austrian physician

References

External links

Villages in Děčín District